Toxteth Park may refer to:

 Toxteth, an inner city area of Liverpool, England
 Toxteth Park, Glebe, an historic house in Sydney, Australia